Philbert may refer to

People
 Madame Philbert (?-1679), a participant in the Affair of the Poisons, executed for murdering her first husband
 Phillippe Rebille Philbert (1639 –  1717), French flautist and court musician to Louis XIV; second husband of Madame Philbert
 Philbert Blair (born 1943), Guyanese cricketer
 Philbert Dy, Filipino film critic
 Philbert Maurice d'Ocagne (1862–1938), French engineer and mathematician

Other uses
 Philbert Frog, British animated series
 Philbert, a show within a show on the fifth season of BoJack Horseman

See also
 Filbert (disambiguation)
 Philibert (disambiguation)